Vítor Costa may refer to:
Vítor Costa (hammer thrower) (born 1974), Portuguese hammer thrower
Vítor Costa (footballer) (born 1994), Brazilian footballer